Stig Broeckx (born 10 May 1990 in Mol) is a Belgian former racing cyclist who was signed to .

Career
During the third stage of the 2016 Tour of Belgium, on 28 May, Broeckx was in a crash caused by two motorbikes that ran into the peloton when it was descending at speed. He was one of the 11 riders hospitalized. He was reported to suffer severe injuries (his heart stopped beating for a time) and was placed in an induced coma at the hospital in Gent. In June 2016, Lotto Soudal team issued a medical update explaining that Stig Broeckx was in a vegetative state with severe brain damage, with attempts to bring him out of his coma so far unsuccessful. A further update in September 2016 stated that Broeckx was being cared for in a rehabilitation centre in Overpelt, and was considered to be in a minimally conscious state, with no hope of recovery. His family insisted that Broeckx be sent to a pioneering coma centre in Liège; in December 2016 team doctor Servaes Bingé confirmed Broeckx was out of a coma.

By 2019 Broeckx had recovered to a great extent, and was able to walk with a cane, although he had no memory of the five years leading up to the accident, and found out who he had been from the Internet. He cycles for recreation; when asked if afraid, he replied "I was already dead, so why [be afraid] now?".

Major results

2007
 2nd Stage Liège-La Gleize
2012
 9th Overall Okolo Slovenska
 9th Flèche Ardennaise
2013
 2nd Omloop Het Nieuwsblad Beloften
 3rd Overall Ardennes Triptych
 7th Overall Triptyque des Monts et Châteaux
 8th Overall World Ports Classic
1st  Young rider classification
2014
 10th Dwars door Drenthe
2015
 5th Binche–Chimay–Binche
2016
 7th Overall Tour of Turkey

References

1990 births
Living people
Belgian male cyclists
People from Mol, Belgium
Cyclists from Antwerp Province
People with disorders of consciousness
People with severe brain damage
21st-century Belgian people